Vladimir Vladimirovich Selkov (born 1 April 1971 in Berezniki) is a former backstroke swimmer from Russia, who won a total number of three silver medals at the Summer Olympics. His only individual medal came at his debut, at the Barcelona Games in 1992, in the 200 m backstroke.

References
 profile
 

1971 births
Living people
Soviet male swimmers
Russian male swimmers
Male backstroke swimmers
Olympic swimmers of the Unified Team
Olympic swimmers of Russia
Swimmers at the 1992 Summer Olympics
Swimmers at the 1996 Summer Olympics
Olympic silver medalists for the Unified Team
Olympic silver medalists for Russia
World Aquatics Championships medalists in swimming
Medalists at the FINA World Swimming Championships (25 m)
European Aquatics Championships medalists in swimming
Medalists at the 1996 Summer Olympics
Medalists at the 1992 Summer Olympics
Olympic silver medalists in swimming
Goodwill Games medalists in swimming
Competitors at the 1998 Goodwill Games
People from Berezniki
Sportspeople from Perm Krai